Grenada competed at the 2011 Pan American Games in Guadalajara, Mexico from October 14 to 30, 2011. Grenada competed with six, later reduced to five athletes from three sports.

Athletics

Grenada has qualified three athletes.

Men

Track and road events

Women

Track and road events

Swimming

Grenada sent only one swimmer.

Men

Taekwondo

Grenada has qualified a team of 1 female athlete.

Women

References

Nations at the 2011 Pan American Games
P
2011